Stuart Cowie (born 22 November 1974) is a former Scottish professional squash player. He won a bronze medal in the men's doubles at the 1998 Commonwealth Games, partnering Peter Nicol.

External links 
 Profile at psa-squash.com
 

1974 births
Living people
Scottish male squash players
Commonwealth Games bronze medallists for Scotland
Commonwealth Games medallists in squash
Squash players at the 1998 Commonwealth Games
Medallists at the 1998 Commonwealth Games